Jasper Wilson (October 30, 1819 – June 12, 1896), was a Baptist preacher and a representative from Bulloch County in the Georgia Legislature from 1881–1885.

Jasper was married to Mary Lee and they had seven children.  Jasper was a circuit rider and preached in various churches, often walking on foot to some of them.  Jasper owned a large plantation near Statesboro, Georgia, and many slaves.  During the Civil War, General Sherman's army went through his plantation.

1819 births
1896 deaths
People from Bulloch County, Georgia
People of Georgia (U.S. state) in the American Civil War
Members of the Georgia House of Representatives
19th-century American politicians
19th-century Baptist ministers from the United States
Baptists from Georgia (U.S. state)